Limnocalanus macrurus is a species of crustacean belonging to the family Centropagidae.

It is native to Eurasia and Northern America.

References

Centropagidae
Crustaceans described in 1863